Nemanja Stojić (born 15 January 1998) is a Serbian football defender who plays for TSC.

International career
Stojić made his debut for Serbia national football team on 25 January 2023 in a friendly match against USA. Serbia won the game 2 – 1, with him being a starter.

Career statistics

International

References

External links
 
 

1998 births
Footballers from Belgrade
Living people
Association football defenders
Serbian footballers
RFK Grafičar Beograd players
FK Zlatibor Čajetina players
FK Metalac Gornji Milanovac players
FK TSC Bačka Topola players
Serbian First League players
Serbian SuperLiga players
Serbia international footballers